Julio Numhauser is a Chilean musician of the Nueva Canción-movement. He founded the folk music group Quilapayún in 1965 together with the brothers, Julio Carrasco and Eduardo Carrasco, where he stayed until 1967. 1968 he founded the folk music group, Amerindios, together with Mario Salazar. In 1980 he founded the group Somos with Francisco Ibarra and Oscar Salazar.

Numhauser left Chile in 1973 due to the presidency of Augusto Pinochet. In 1975 he moved to Sweden, where he still lives today. In 2000 he was chosen to be the cultural attaché of the Chilean embassy in Sweden by the Chilean president Ricardo Lagos.

Discography

With Quilapayún 
 1967 - Quilapayún

With Amerindios 
 1970 - Amerindios
 1973 - Tu grito es mi canto
 1978 - Alejado de ti... pero contigo

Solo albums 
 1982 - Todo cambia
 1984 - Somos PAX
 1989 - A Chile con todo el amor (CBS)
 1997 - Nuevos caminos
 2001 - Antología (Warner Music)

Collections 
 2003 - Nueva Canción Chilena. Antología definitiva

References 

1939 births
Living people
Chilean folk singers
20th-century Chilean male singers
Chilean singer-songwriters
Nueva canción musicians
Chilean people of German-Jewish descent
Chilean expatriates in Sweden
Cultural attachés
20th-century Chilean male artists